Carnal Knowledge is a 1971 American erotic coming-of-age romantic comedy-drama film directed by Mike Nichols and written by Jules Feiffer. It stars Jack Nicholson, Art Garfunkel, Ann-Margret, Candice Bergen, and Rita Moreno.

Plot
In the late 1940s, Amherst College roommates Sandy and Jonathan discuss women, and what kind appeals to each. Sandy is gentle and passive, while Jonathan Fuerst is tough and aggressive. Sandy idolizes women, while Jonathan objectifies them.  Jonathan frequently uses the term "ballbuster" to describe women as emasculating teases whose main pleasure is to deny pleasure to men; he extends this term to mean women who want to get married instead of accepting that men mostly want unattached sex. Since each man's perspective on womanhood is extreme and self-serving, neither is able to sustain a relationship with a woman.

Sandy meets Susan at an on-campus event and they begin dating. Although they enjoy each other's company, Susan is reluctant to enter into a physical relationship. Unbeknownst to Sandy, she is also pursued by Jonathan, who feels a physical attraction for her. They have sex. Jonathan tries to persuade Susan not to have sex with Sandy, but after some delays, Susan is also having sex with Sandy. Because of this, Susan and Jonathan break up.

Several years after college, Sandy is married to Susan, while Jonathan still searches for his "perfect woman." Jonathan now defines perfection by a woman's bust size and figure. Jonathan begins a relationship with Bobbie , a beautiful woman who fulfills all of his physical requirements. However, Jonathan constantly berates Bobbie for being shallow. Jonathan finds that this purely physical relationship is no more satisfying than his previous relationship with Susan. Bobbie leaves her job at Jonathan's suggestion. She then becomes depressed, spending long hours doing nothing but sleeping in the apartment she shares with Jonathan. The relationship deteriorates. Jonathan berates Bobbie for not cleaning up the apartment while he is out working all day at a nine-to-five job. He claims that he doesn't understand why breakups always have to end with "poison."

Sandy's relationship with Susan is faring no better. Sandy is dissatisfied and bored with the physical part of their relationship, even though he and Susan "do all the right things." He relates how they are "patient with each other" and concludes with a statement that perhaps sex is not "meant to be enjoyable with the person you love."

Sandy and Susan end their relationship. Sandy begins dating Cindy. Sandy, Cindy, Jonathan, and Bobbie find themselves together at Jonathan's apartment, where Sandy complains privately to Jonathan that Cindy gets so busy handing out instructions in bed that it's like a close-order drill. Jonathan suggests to Sandy that they trade partners, to "liven things up a bit." Sandy goes to the bedroom looking for Bobbie. Cindy dances with Jonathan and reprimands him for attempting to bed her with Sandy nearby, but indicates she is open to seeing him on his own, saying he should contact her at a more appropriate time. In the meantime, upset by an earlier fight with Jonathan about her desire to get married, Bobbie has attempted suicide. She is found by Sandy, who calls the hospital to have her taken to intensive care.

Years later, a now-middle-aged Jonathan presents a slideshow entitled "Ballbusters on Parade" to Sandy (also middle-aged) and Sandy's 18-year-old girlfriend, Jennifer. The slideshow consists of pictures of Jonathan's various loves throughout his life. He skips awkwardly over a slide of Susan, but not before Sandy notices. He also shows an image of Bobbie, saying they are divorced and had one child together, and he is paying her alimony. Jennifer leaves in tears. Sandy idolizes his new lover, explaining that "she knows worlds which I cannot begin to touch yet." Jonathan believes his friend is deluding himself.

Time passes. Jonathan remains successful, but is alone. A prostitute is with him, and they go through a ritual dialogue about male/female relationships which is apparently a script written by Jonathan. At the end, the prostitute recites a monologue (again scripted by Jonathan) praising his power and "perfection," which apparently has become the only way Jonathan can now get an erection.

Cast
 Jack Nicholson as Jonathan Fuerst
 Arthur Garfunkel as Sandy
 Candice Bergen as Susan
 Ann-Margret as Bobbie
 Rita Moreno as Louise
 Carol Kane as Jennifer
 Cynthia O'Neal as Cindy

Production
The script was originally written as a play. Jules Feiffer sent it to Mike Nichols, who thought it would work better as a film.  The script contains numerous curse words, some of which were rarely heard on the screen before this time.

The $5 million budget was provided by Joseph E. Levine of which $1 million went to Nichols. The movie was shot in Vancouver. It marked a major comeback for Ann-Margret.

Legal problems
The changes in the morals of American society of the 1960s and 1970s and the general receptiveness by the public to frank discussion of sexual issues was sometimes at odds with local community standards. A theatre in Albany, Georgia, showed the film; on January 13, 1972, the local police served a search warrant on the theatre, and seized the film. In March 1972, the theatre manager, Mr. Jenkins, was convicted of the crime of "distributing obscene material". His conviction was upheld by the Supreme Court of Georgia. On June 24, 1974, the U.S. Supreme Court found that the State of Georgia had gone too far in classifying material as obscene in view of its prior decision in Miller v. California,  (the Miller standard), and overturned the conviction in Jenkins v. Georgia, . The court also said that, 

Avco Embassy re-released the film to theaters after the Supreme Court ruling, using the tagline "The United States Supreme Court has ruled that 'Carnal Knowledge' is  See it now!"

Reception

Critical response
Roger Ebert of the Chicago Sun-Times gave the film four stars out of four and called it "clearly Mike Nichols' best film. It sets out to tell us certain things about these few characters and their sexual crucifixions, and it succeeds. It doesn't go for cheap or facile laughs, or inappropriate symbolism, or a phony kind of contemporary feeling ... Nicholson, who is possibly the most interesting new movie actor since James Dean, carries the film, and his scenes with Ann-Margret are masterfully played." Vincent Canby of The New York Times was also positive, calling it "a nearly ideal collaboration of directorial and writing talents" that was "not only very funny, but in a casual way—in the way of something observed in a half-light—more profound than much more ambitious films." Writing in Film Quarterly, Ernest Callenbach  called it "a solid and interesting achievement—as was [Nichols'] Virginia Woolf. It is a cold and merciless film, but then artists are not required to stand in for the Red Cross. They document disasters, and it is we the viewers who must clean them up, in our own lives." Gavin Millar of The Monthly Film Bulletin wrote, "Though not the last word on the subject, it's still a telling and unhysterical assault on male chauvinism; and if that's fashionable, it's not unwelcome."

Charles Champlin of the Los Angeles Times was less enthused, calling the film "the iciest, most merciless and most repellent major (and seriously intended) motion picture in a very long time." Champlin thought that Nicholson had "some powerful moments" but his character "is never comprehensible as anything but a clinical study, although the study offers no clues to how he got that way." Arthur D. Murphy of Variety called it "a rather superficial and limited probe of American male sexual hypocrisies." Gary Arnold of The Washington Post wrote, "I wouldn't mind having a nickel for every moviegoer who walks out of 'Carnal Knowledge' feeling cheated and despondent. The basic problem with the film is that it's the artistic equivalent of the sort of thing it purports to be satirizing and abhorring: it's a cold, calculating, unfeeling view of cold, calculating, unfeeling relationships." Gene Siskel of the Chicago Tribune gave the film two-and-a-half stars out of four and called it "basically a one-note story ... The characters do not change or learn; they do not even repeat their mistakes in very interesting ways." Pauline Kael of The New Yorker wrote, "This movie says not merely that there are some people like these, but that this is it—that is, that this movie, in its own satirical terms, presents a more accurate view of men and women than conventional movies do. That may be the case, but the movie isn't convincing."

Rotten Tomatoes retrospectively gives the film a score of 88% based on reviews from 32 critics, with an average rating of 7.70/10. The site's critics consensus reads: "Although it comes lopsidedly from the male gaze, Carnal Knowledge is a sexually frank and ferociously well-acted battle between the sexes."

Accolades

In popular culture
 The 1971 All in the Family episode "Gloria Poses in the Nude" has Archie and Edith coming home after watching the film. Edith thought it was a religious film because she thought the title of the film was Cardinal Knowledge until Archie corrects her. The film was financed by Norman Lear's AVCO Embassy Pictures.
 The 1992 The Wonder Years episode "Carnal Knowledge" has Kevin Arnold and his friends attempting to sneak in to see the film despite being underage.
 In the 1992 Seinfeld episode "The Trip", George Costanza and Jerry Seinfeld ponder whether Candice Bergen showed her breasts in the film.
 The 1993 animated series Rocko's Modern Life has an episode titled "Carnival Knowledge", which is a pun on the movie's title, although the episode itself has very little to do with the film.

Home media

Carnal Knowledge was released on DVD December 7, 1999, by MGM Home Video.

See also
 List of American films of 1971

References

External links

 
 
 
 
 

1971 films
1970s buddy comedy-drama films
1970s coming-of-age comedy-drama films
American buddy comedy-drama films
American coming-of-age drama films
American independent films
American sex comedy films
Embassy Pictures films
1970s English-language films
Films directed by Mike Nichols
Films featuring a Best Supporting Actress Golden Globe-winning performance
Films set in Massachusetts
Films set in New York City
Films set in the 1940s
Films set in the 1950s
Films set in the 1960s
Films set in the 1970s
Films set in universities and colleges
Films shot in New York City
Metro-Goldwyn-Mayer films
Obscenity controversies in film
Films with screenplays by Jules Feiffer
Works subject to a lawsuit
1971 comedy films
1971 drama films
1971 independent films
1970s American films